was the capital of Japan from 784 to 794. Its location was reported as Otokuni District, Yamashiro Province, and Nagaokakyō, Kyoto, which took its name from the capital. Parts of the capital were in what is now the city of Nagaokakyō, while other parts were in the present-day Mukō and Nishikyō-ku, the latter of which belongs to the city of Kyoto. 

In 784, the Emperor Kanmu moved the capital from Nara (then called Heijō-kyō). According to the Shoku Nihongi, his reason for moving was that the new location had better water transportation routes. Other explanations have been given, including the wish to escape the power of the Buddhist clergy and courtiers, and the backing of the immigrants from whom his mother was descended.

In 785, the administrator in charge of the new capital, Fujiwara no Tanetsugu, was assassinated. The emperor's brother, Prince Sawara, was implicated, exiled to Awaji Province, and died on the way there. 

In 794, Emperor Kammu moved the capital to Heian (in the center of the present-day city of Kyoto). Reasons cited for this move include frequent flooding of the rivers that had promised better transportation; disease caused by the flooding, affecting the empress and crown prince; and fear of the spirit of the late Prince Sawara. 

Excavations begun in 1954 revealed the remains of a gate to the imperial residence.

External links
Japan National Historical Museum exhibit 

Populated places established in the 8th century
784 establishments
794 disestablishments
Former capitals of Japan
Nara period
Historic Sites of Japan
8th-century establishments in Japan
8th-century disestablishments in Japan
Emperor Kanmu
Nagaokakyō